Lava Lake lies in the Cascade Range about  west-southwest of Bend in the U.S. state of Oregon. It is a close neighbor of Little Lava Lake, from which it is separated by solidified lava.

Lava Lake, Little Lava Lake, and other nearby lakes are volcanogenic, having formed after lava flows from Mount Bachelor altered drainage patterns in the area. Solidified lava flows are visible along the shorelines of both lakes, and the volcanic peaks Broken Top and South Sister can be seen to the north.

Recreation
Controlled populations of tui chub also live in the lake.

A United States Forest Service campground and a private resort are near the lake, and  Little Lava Lake also has campsites. Amenities around the lake include parking areas, two boat ramps, and a fish cleaning station.

Trails in the area offer opportunities for hiking. One trail follows the east side of the lake, while another heads south into Three Sisters Wilderness and on to Williamson Mountain.

See also
 List of lakes in Oregon

References

External links

Lava Lake Campground – U.S. Forest Service

Lakes of Deschutes County, Oregon
Lakes of Oregon
Deschutes National Forest
Lava dammed lakes